Below is a list of episodes from What's Happening!!, a sitcom that aired on ABC from 1976 to 1979.

Series overview

Episodes

Season 1 (1976–77)

Season 2 (1977–78)

Season 3 (1978–79)

Home releases

External links
 

Lists of American sitcom episodes